Events during the year 2006 in Italy.

Incumbents
President: 
Carlo Azeglio Ciampi (until 15 May)
Giorgio Napolitano (from 15 May)
Prime Minister: 
Silvio Berlusconi (until 17 May)
Romano Prodi (from 17 May)

Events  
10–26 February  – The Olympic Winter Games are held in Turin.
10–19 March  – The Paralympic Winter Games are held in Turin.
9 July – Italy wins the FIFA World Cup by defeating France, 5–3, following a penalty shootout in the final game at the Olympic Stadium in Berlin, Germany.
13 August – Air Algérie Flight 2208 accident
17 October – 2006 Rome Metro crash

Full date unknown 
Drug Target Insights academic journal is founded.

Deaths  

1 March – Jenny Tamburi, actress and television hostess (b. 1952).
5 April – Pasquale Macchi, Roman Catholic archbishop (b. 1923).
22 April – Alida Valli, actress (b. 1921).
11 May – Ferdinando Tacconi, comics artist (b. 1922).
9 June – Enzo Siciliano, writer (b. 1934).
15 June – Betty Curtis, singer (b. 1936)
12 July – Loredana Nusciak, actress and model (b. 1942).
20 July – Ugo Attardi, painter, sculptor and writer (b. 1923).
31 July – Mario Faustinelli, comic book artist (b. 1924).
20 August – Giuseppe Moccia, film director (b. 1933)
15 September – Sergio Savarese, furniture designer (b. 1958).
17 September – Leonella Sgorbati, nun (b. 1940).
12 October –  Carlo Acutis, English-born Italian Catholic computer programmer (b. 1991)
16 October – Ondina Valla, hurdler (b. 1916).
25 October – Emilio Vedova, painter (b. 1919).
2 November – Milly Vitale, actress (b. 1933).
25 November – Luciano Bottaro, comic book creator (b. 1931).
26 November – 
Leo Chiosso, songwriter (b. 1920).
Giorgio Panto, television station owner and politician, (b. 1941).
28 November – Primo Volpi, 90, Italian cyclist (b. 1916).
13 December – Mario Ravagnan, fencer (b. 1930).
28 December – 
Nicola Granieri, fencer (b. 1942).
Aroldo Tieri, actor (b. 1917).

References 

 
2000s in Italy
Years of the 21st century in Italy
Italy
Italy